"WAP" (acronym of Wet-Ass Pussy) is a song by American rapper Cardi B featuring guest vocals from fellow American rapper Megan Thee Stallion. It was released through Atlantic Records on August 7, 2020, as the lead single from Cardi B's upcoming second studio album. Musically, it is a hip hop song driven by heavy bass, drum beats, and a sample of Frank Ski's Baltimore club single "Whores in This House" (1993). In the lyrics, Cardi B and Megan discuss how they want to be pleased by men, specifically referencing numerous sexual practices.

"WAP" received widespread critical acclaim for its sex-positive message and for empowering women, with Rolling Stone, NPR, and several other publications ranking it as the best song of 2020. Some observers, ranging from social conservative pundits and politicians to other musicians criticized the song for its sexually explicit lyrics. It debuted atop the US Billboard Hot 100, becoming the first female rap collaboration to do so, and had the largest opening streaming week for a song in U.S. history. It gave Cardi B her fourth number-one single and Megan her second in the U.S. The single spent four weeks atop the chart and spent multiple weeks at number one in several other countries. "WAP" became the first number-one single on the inaugural Billboard Global 200, topping the chart for three weeks, and it earned the 11th position on IFPI's year-end singles chart. , the song was certified 7× Platinum by the Recording Industry Association of America (RIAA).

The music video, directed by Colin Tilley, features cameos from several women, including television star Kylie Jenner, singers Normani and Rosalía, and rappers Latto, Sukihana, and Rubi Rose. "WAP" broke the record for the biggest 24-hour debut for an all-female collaboration on YouTube. Cardi B and Megan performed the song at the 63rd Annual Grammy Awards.

Background and release
On August 3, 2020, Cardi B revealed that she would release a collaboration with Megan Thee Stallion soon, and simultaneously unveiled its cover art on social media. Three days later on August 6, she announced via Instagram that the music video for the song would be released alongside it on August 7, but that the video would feature the censored version of the track. A clean version was sent to US radio, as opposed to the original version. In it, the hook is changed from "wet-ass pussy" to "wet and gushy", among other censors. It marked Cardi B's first release of 2020, and Megan's first release following a highly publicized shooting incident allegedly involving her and Tory Lanez, where Megan sustained injuries from a bullet to her feet. Cardi B confirmed that the song will appear on her upcoming second studio album.

Production and composition

"WAP" is an acronym for "Wet-Ass Pussy". Cardi B wrote and recorded her verses for the track and reworked parts of it several times. She wrote multiple versions of the hook before deciding on a final one. Cardi B and Megan Thee Stallion first connected through their respective wardrobe stylists. After meeting her in Los Angeles, Cardi B told her team that she was considering a collaboration with her. A couple of days later, both sent tracks to each other. Cardi B had her business partner Brooklyn Johnny send "WAP". After receiving her verses, the song's engineers started editing and mixing vocals, as well as reworking the beat and the arrangement to make it more hooky.

"WAP" is a hip hop, trap, and dirty rap song with heavy bass, and it heavily samples Frank Ski's 1993 Baltimore club single "Whores in This House". Ski teased his involvement in a Twitter post the day before the song's release. Writing credits are given to Cardi B, Megan Thee Stallion, producers Ayo the Producer and Keyz, Ski, and Pardison Fontaine.

Reception

Critical response
"WAP" received widespread critical acclaim. For Pitchfork, Lakin Starling called it "a nasty-ass rap bop, bursting with the personality of two of rap's most congenial household names". Jon Caramanica of The New York Times deemed it "an event record that transcends the event itself", and stated that both rappers "are exuberant, sharp and extremely ... vividly detailed" in the song that "luxuriates in raunch". Rania Aniftos of Billboard described the song as a "scorching banger". Mikael Wood of Los Angeles Times deemed it a "savage, nasty, sex-positive triumph" and stated that "the women's vocal exuberance is the show—the way they tear into each perfectly rendered lyric and chew up the words like meat". Cardi B's voice in the song was described as "throaty" and "staccato".

For The Guardian, Dream McClinton wrote, "the hit collaboration ... has become a belated song of the summer, empowering women and enraging prudes along the way ... [it] should be celebrated, not scolded". In NPR, cultural critic Taylor Crumpton deemed both rappers "women leading the genre into [a] new era of unification between women rappers" with "an already iconic song about women sexuality". She praised the message, describing it as "if you need to come, step to me, you have to be able to fill my sexual needs, and these are what they are". In another article from Pitchfork, Jayson Greene said that it "has become the song of this ... summer—a ripe ... sex jam", deeming it detailed and "joyfully explicit".

Reactions from conservative figures
"WAP" was criticized by many social conservatives in the United States, who claimed that the song was offensive and prurient and that it would cause harm to American culture and society. James P. Bradley, a health industry executive and Republican politician, wrote, "Cardi B & Megan Thee Stallion are what happens when children are raised without God and without a strong father figure", adding that the song made him want to "pour holy water" in his ears. DeAnna Lorraine, also a California Republican, said the song set "the entire female gender back by 100 years." and that rappers were "completely wrong" if they thought the song does "anything to empower women."Defenders of the song claimed that critics mischaracterized the artists. August Brown of the Los Angeles Times wrote that, contrary to Bradley's comments, Megan "did indeed have a strong father figure" and Cardi B "is no stranger to faith". Social media users accused Lorraine of hypocrisy for using the language of women's advocacy to denigrate a song created by two women.

Megan Thee Stallion responded personally to Lorraine's comments in an interview with GQ, mocking Lorraine for having "literally had to go listen to this song in its entirety". She went on to say that critics of the song, including Lorraine, must not have "WAP" themselves.

Conservative political commentator Ben Shapiro criticized the song's message in a widely seen video in which he recited the song's lyrics, many of which he self-censored with euphemisms such as "p-word". He sarcastically stated that "this is what feminism fought for".

Shapiro's video was mocked by multiple news outlets and fans of the song. Shapiro's comments, particularly his remarks on vaginal lubrication, were condemned as medically inaccurate by prominent gynecologists; many social media users also mocked the comment as a "self-own", implying that Shapiro was unfamiliar with vaginal lubrication due to an inability to sexually satisfy his wife. Arwa Mahdawi in The Guardian opined that Shapiro's reaction was proof that "women taking charge of their sexuality ... drives conservatives up the wall", and remarked that Shapiro "doesn't seem particularly well acquainted with female anatomy".

Impact 
Complex called the song "the epitome of female empowerment." in which the women featured are "unapologetically themselves." In The Wall Street Journal, Neil Shah considered the song "a big moment for female rappers" and "a historic sign that women artists are making their mark on hip-hop like never before". In The New York Times, Ben Sisario commented that it "is almost certainly the most explicit song ever to reach the top". Similarly, Slate staff deemed it "the dirtiest and most sexually-explicit Hot 100 number one of all time". Nick Levine of the BBC stated that the success of the song as a "celebration of female sexual agency" creates space for many more female artists "to write unselfconsciously about what they want". Carl Lamarre of Billboard stated that the song's success has "a deeper significance", describing it as "a clever Trojan horse for the myriad ways Cardi B influences the culture with every move she makes". In an article for The Independent about what the song's commercial achievement says about the changing shape of the music industry, Micha Frazer-Carroll stated that "the undeniable smash of the year captured the spirit of 2020". Complex staff named it the song "that had the most pure impact" in 2020, with it being an "empowering anthem" largely because is "a record-breaking song performed by two Black women". Rolling Stone staff commented that the public outrage from conservative figures contributed to the song's "pop-cultural impact".

On October 22, 2022, Madonna marked the 30th anniversary of the publication of her coffee table book Sex, contemplating its impact on modern pop culture. Cardi B took offense and tweeted a day later that "these icons really become disappointments once [you] make it in the industry." However, later that day she deleted the tweets, and claimed she had talked to Madonna and that it had been "beautiful".

Music video 
The video for "WAP", directed by Colin Tilley, uses the clean version of the song. Cardi B said that over $100,000 was spent getting COVID-19 testing for everyone on set. Garnering over 26 million views in its first day, "WAP" broke the record for the biggest 24-hour debut for an all-female collaboration on YouTube. While making the video for "WAP", co-creative director  Foster said that Cardi B proposed the idea of "a house full of powerful women" without exclusions.

Synopsis

The video shows Cardi B and Megan walking through a colorful mansion. Cardi B and Megan open the video in the mansion hallway, wearing custom Nicolas Jebran dresses, opera gloves, and matching updos. During Cardi B's first verse they also appear in a snake-filled room. For this transition, the door knocker comes alive as a snake and eats the camera. The next scene shows both rappers in a green and purple room wearing Thierry Mugler outfits, composed of a corset bodice, mesh tights and sleeves, with Megan performing her first verse. Kylie Jenner then walks through to a hallway to where Cardi B is. For her second verse, Cardi B appears in a leopard-themed room, wearing a matching long-sleeved bodysuit with cut-outs in the front and pasties, also by Mugler, with leopards surrounding her. Megan appears in a white tiger-themed bathroom with white tigers around her in a black-and-white Juraj Zigman garment. The pool scene includes a dance routine choreographed by JaQuel Knight and performed by both artists. In addition to Jenner, the video includes cameos from Normani, Rosalía, Latto, Rubi Rose, and Sukihana.

Critical reception
Writing for Billboard, Trevor Anderson commented that the video "transformed from just a promotional clip into a pop-culture phenomenon". Claire Shaffer and Althea Legaspi of Rolling Stone called the video "steamy" and "sensual". Chris Murphy of Vulture described the video as "very Dr. Seuss, but make it NSFW in a fun way".  In Complex, Brianna Holt commented, "the music video couldn't be more timely".  She described the set as "a mansion full of women who are demonstrative of their sexual prowess".  Writing for The Guardian, Dream McClinton deemed the video "unapologetic in celebrating the sensuality and sexuality of women", adding, "it isn't shy or coy, it's about the loud articulation of female desire for sex, as they want it, and it centres them as active participants with agency". Burr in The Boston Globe argued that the same adults "who are up in arms over Cardi B on YouTube today" due to the video's "in-your-face outrageousness" celebrated sexually charged music videos on MTV 30 years ago, questioning if people "forget the youthful yearning to be free" when they become parents. He further added that the reason why "the rococo visual matters" is that it shows what it looks like "when a woman of color takes charge, which is still taboo in many corners of this country".

Alyssa Rosenberg of The Washington Post described the video as "an ode to female sexual pleasure" that is among the most sexually explicit content she has ever seen in mainstream American popular culture, and opined that in a "weird year" like 2020 "a culture-war clash feels refreshingly normal". Micha Frazer-Carroll of The Independent deemed the "absurdist" video "ludicrously excessive but utterly hypnotic" that "feels as if it were taking place in an alternative universe". In IndieWire, Leonardo Adrian Garcia considered it "a mix of Hype Williams and Tim Burton by way of the strip club", further adding that "it's a video that demands one’s attention" and "deserves praise" despite the "lightning rod for very dumb controversy" that generated.

Writing for Pitchfork, Eric Torres called the music video "easily one of the best of the year", deeming it "a vibrant display of self-empowerment that could only come from two of rap's most brazenly sex-positive voices". In Complex, Jessica McKinney stated that the video created "an inescapable pop culture moment" that "completely dominated the conversation" with "vivid imagery, glamorous costumes, trippy effects, and dynamic choreography", further adding that it "set the standard for quality videos in 2020, calling for other artists to put more thought and effort into their visuals as we move into the new year".

Other responses
Fan reactions to Kylie Jenner's cameo in the video were negative. Many social media users expressed displeasure with her appearance in a video whose cast mainly consisted of Black women, especially considering her history of alleged cultural appropriation. Cardi B later explained that she put Jenner in the video because Jenner was a close friend of hers, saying, "Not everything is about race." Foster was asked about a Change.org petition that called for Jenner to be removed from the music video, and she called it "bullshit".

Tiger King star and Big Cat Rescue CEO Carole Baskin spoke out against the use of big cats in the video.  In a statement for Billboard, she added that the video promotes wealthy individuals owning tigers as pets.  "That makes every ignorant follower want to imitate by doing the same", said Baskin, adding that "they probably dealt with one of the big cat pimps, who makes a living from beating ... cats to make them stand on cue in front of a green screen in a studio." Cardi B responded in an interview with Vice, saying "I'm not gonna engage with Carole Baskin on that ... Like, that's just ridiculous, you know? ... Like, girl you killed your goddamn husband." Representatives from PETA similarly took issue with the use of big cats in the video, saying in another statement to Billboard, "if real animals were used instead of computer-generated imagery, the message sent is that animal exploitation is Okurrr—and it isn't. If Cardi B and Megan Thee Stallion really care about pussy liberation, they wouldn't use suffering big cats as props."

Commercial performance

North America
"WAP" debuted at number one on the Billboard Hot 100 chart, garnering Cardi B her fourth chart-topper in the US, extending her record as the female rapper with the most number-one singles. It was Megan's second number-one single. Cardi B became the only female rapper to achieve Hot 100 number-one singles in two different decades (2010s and 2020s). "WAP" became the first female rap collaboration to debut at number one on the Hot 100. The song was driven by 93 million streams, 125,000 downloads and 11.6 million radio airplay impressions. As the song topped the Digital Song Sales and Streaming Songs charts, it became Cardi B's fourth chart-topper on the former, Cardi B's third on the latter, and Megan's second on both.

The 93 million streaming total became the largest number of first-week streams in Billboard history and of weekly streams in 2020. "WAP" generated the most weekly on-demand US audio streams among songs by female artists, with 54.7 million streams, during the best sales week for a song since Taylor Swift's "Me!" featuring Brendon Urie.

"WAP" became the first song to spend its first two weeks at number one on the Hot 100 since Ariana Grande's "7 Rings". In between those chart-toppers, eight songs debuted at number one, each spending a single week at the summit. Of the 42 songs that have entered the chart at number one since the Hot 100 started in 1958, 19 including "WAP" remained on top in their second weeks. "WAP" also became the first song among female artists to lead the Hot 100 for multiple weeks since Mariah Carey's "All I Want for Christmas Is You". For the chart issue dated September 26, "WAP" achieved a fourth non-consecutive week atop the chart.

"WAP" also reached number one on the Hot R&B/Hip-Hop Songs and Hot Rap Songs charts, marking Cardi B's fifth number-one entry on the former and fourth on the latter, and Megan's second on both. Billboard called the song "one of the most dominant Hot 100 number ones of the last 30 years".

"WAP" debuted at number one on the Canadian Hot 100, becoming Cardi B's second chart-topper and Megan's first. It spent four non-consecutive weeks atop the chart. It was the most streamed song of 2020 in the US by a female artist, with 732.7 million on-demand streams, ranking sixth among all. In the US, Cardi B has achieved three times the best-performing song of the year by a female artist—the only act to do so this century—with "WAP" (2020) joining "Bodak Yellow" (2017) and "I Like It" (2018).

Europe and Oceania
In Australia, "WAP" became the third hip hop song by female artists to top the ARIA Singles Chart, and the first since 1992. It spent six weeks atop the chart, becoming the longest-running number-one song by a female hip hop artist.

In the United Kingdom, "WAP" debuted at number four on the UK Singles Chart's August 14 – 20, 2020, weekly chart. During its fourth consecutive week on the chart (September 4 – 10), the song reached number one―becoming both artists' first song to top the charts in Britain and the first female rap collaboration to do so. The song spent three weeks at the top of the chart.

The song became the first number-one single for both artists on the Republic of Ireland's Irish Singles Chart, where it spent three weeks at the top.

"WAP" debuted at number two on the Official New Zealand Music Chart, peaking at the top of the chart the following week, becoming Cardi B's second chart-topper and Megan's first chart-topper. It remained atop the chart for six weeks.

Worldwide
The music video for "WAP" broke the record for the most views within 24 hours for a female collaboration, with over 26.5 million views. Cardi B was ranked at number one on Bloomberg's August 2020 Pop Star Power Ranking due to the success of "WAP".

The song charted at number one on Billboards Global 200—with 100.9 million global streams and 23,000 global downloads—and number three on its Global Excl. US during the inaugural week of both charts (September 4, 2020). It topped the Global 200 chart for three non-consecutive weeks.

Live performances
"WAP" was first performed by Megan Thee Stallion in a Tidal Live performance on August 29, 2020. Cardi B and Megan Thee Stallion performed it together for the first time at the 63rd Annual Grammy Awards, airing on CBS on March 14, 2021. Grammys host Trevor Noah prefaced the performance with, "If you have small children in the room, just tell them it's a song about giving a cat a bath". The chorus—replaced in censored versions with "wet and gushy" was changed to "wet, wet, wet". Billboard ranked it as the best performance of the ceremony, commenting that "this had to be one of the most insane television debut performances of all time." Music critic Jon Caramanica called the performance "wildly and charmingly salacious, frisky and genuine in a way that the Grammys has rarely if ever made room for". The performance received criticism for being "non family-friendly". In 2022, Rolling Stone listed it among the 25 "greatest Grammy performances of all time", the only female rap act on the list.

Cover versions

On August 10, 2020, rapper Safaree released a remix of "WAP" called "B.A.D" (an acronym for "Big Ass Dick"). The cover art features Cardi B and Megan on both ends, with a woman (assumed to be his wife Erica Mena) performing simulated oral sex on him in the center. The remix was widely panned by fans on social media, many of whom found the remix to be poorly timed, considering how soon after the song's original release it came. The same day, dancehall singer Vybz Kartel released a freestyle remix while in prison, which was met with enthusiasm by Cardi B.

Rapper Plies released a "P-Mix" to the song on August 14, to positive reception. Country singer Margo Price performed an acoustic rendition on The Daily Show with Trevor Noah, as part of a segment on double standards about sex in music. Rolling Stones Claire Shaffer said of the cover, "Price puts her genuine all into the song, and it comes out sounding like a legitimate country ode to 'wet ass pussy. YouTube parody artist Lardi B posted a food-based parody of the song, changing the acronym from "Wet-Ass Pussy" to "Wings and Pizza", on August 14.

Rapper Qveen Herby released a baroque pop cover version of the song as a promotional single on August 20. Drag queens Lady Bunny and Flotilla DeBarge released a parody of the song, entitled "DAP" (or Dry-Ass Pussy), on August 28. A remix set to the 1986 musical The Phantom of the Operas main theme was posted to TikTok, where Andrew Lloyd Webber, the musical's composer, posted a video playing the piano to it. Scottish rock band Biffy Clyro performed a cover of the song for BBC Radio 1's Live Lounge on September 3, 2020.

Accolades

Rankings
"*" indicates an unordered list.

Industry awards

Personnel
Credits adapted from Tidal.

 Cardi B – vocals, songwriting
 Megan Thee Stallion – vocals, songwriting
 Ayo the Producer – production, songwriting
 Keyz – production, songwriting
 Pardison Fontaine – songwriting
 Frank Ski – songwriting
 Evan LaRay – engineering
 Shawn "Source" Jarrett – engineering
 Leslie Braithwaite – mixing
 Colin Leonard – mastering

Charts

Weekly charts

Monthly charts

Year-end charts

Certifications and sales

Release history

References

2020 singles
2020 songs
Atlantic Records singles
Billboard Hot 100 number-one singles
Billboard Global 200 number-one singles
Canadian Hot 100 number-one singles
Cardi B songs
Dirty rap songs
Irish Singles Chart number-one singles
Megan Thee Stallion songs
Number-one singles in Australia
Number-one singles in Greece
Number-one singles in New Zealand
Obscenity controversies in music
Sex-positive feminism
Song recordings produced by Ayo the Producer
Song recordings produced by Keyz (producer)
Songs about telephones
Songs with feminist themes
Songs written by Cardi B
Songs written by Megan Thee Stallion
Songs written by Pardison Fontaine
Songs written by Keyz (producer)
Songs written by Ayo the Producer
Songs written by Frank Ski
UK Singles Chart number-one singles